Medina Dixon (November 2, 1962 – November 8, 2021) was an American basketball player born in Boston, Massachusetts. She was a member of the United States women's national basketball team during the late 1980s and the early 1990s, collecting three medals during her international career. Dixon originally signed and played the 1981-82 season with South Carolina Gamecocks women's basketball.  She would transfer to Old Dominion University where she played for three seasons.

College statistics
Sources:

USA Basketball
Dixon represented the US at the World Championships held in Kuala Lumpur, Malaysia in July 1990. The team won all eight games, earning the gold medal. Dixon scored 8.3 points per game and had 15 assists, second highest on the team.

Dixon again played with the USA team at the 1991 Pan American Games. The team finished with a record of 4–2, but managed to win the bronze medal. The USA team lost a three-point game to Brazil, then responded with wins over Argentina and Cuba, earning a spot in the medal round. The next game was a rematch against Cuba, and this time the team from Cuba won a five-point game. The USA beat Canada easily to win the bronze. Dixon averaged 7.8 points per game.

At the 1992 Olympic games in Barcelona, Spain, Dixon was the leading scorer of the USA team with 15.8 points per game. Dixon led the team in scoring against China, which set up a medal round game against the Unified Team and fell, 79–73, even though Dixon set a USA team single scoring record with 28 points. The USA team then faced Cuba for the bronze medal. The game was tied at halftime, and  Cuba had a small lead midway through the second half, but the USA went on a run to retake the lead, and finished with an 88–74 victory and the bronze medal.

Dixon died on November 8, 2021, of pancreatic cancer.

References

External links
 

1962 births
2021 deaths
All-American college women's basketball players
American women's basketball players
Basketball players at the 1991 Pan American Games
Basketball players at the 1992 Summer Olympics
Basketball players from Boston
Medalists at the 1991 Pan American Games
Medalists at the 1992 Summer Olympics
Old Dominion Monarchs women's basketball players
Olympic bronze medalists for the United States in basketball
Pan American Games bronze medalists for the United States
Pan American Games medalists in basketball
Parade High School All-Americans (girls' basketball)
Deaths from pancreatic cancer
African-American basketball players
20th-century African-American women
20th-century African-American sportspeople
21st-century African-American women
21st-century African-American people
United States women's national basketball team players